The Merchant Marine Officers Training School (EFOMM) is a military higher education institution, managed by the Brazilian Navy and maintained with resources from the Merchant Marine Fund. EFOMM serves as a reference center of the International Maritime Organization for the training of Merchant Marine Officers for the South American region.

In Brazil, there are two sister schools maintained by the Brazilian Navy, one being at the Centro de Instrução Almirante Graça Aranha (CIAGA), in Rio de Janeiro, and the other at the Centro de Instrução Almirante Brás de Aguiar (CIABA), in Belém, Pará.

History 
By decision of the Brazilian Government, the most appropriate solution for the formation of qualified personnel was given to the Navy, through the Directorate of Ports and Coasts (DPC), which became responsible for the technical-professional education of all seamen, including the subordinate personnel that until then did not have a school for their apprenticeship.

In 1980, the Navy Reserve Officers' Training Center (NFORM) was created, with the main task of providing EFOMM students with the necessary instruction for training to perform military functions. Since then, through EFOMM, it has been training Officers, updating and improving them in the various phases of their careers, and offering a vast program of special courses to all seafarers.

Admission 
In addition to requiring a high school education, to be eligible to enter the academy a candidate must:
 Be at least 17 years of age, and must not have passed their 23rd birthday before January 1 in the year of entrance.
 Be a citizen of Brazil, either by birth or naturalization.
 Meet the physical, security, and character requirements necessary for appointment as midshipman in the Brazilian Navy.
 Qualify academically.

Medical/Physical Clearance – Candidates are required to pass a physical test (TSF), it is to pass the physical evaluation made by the Navy Health Directorate (DSM) known as Psychophysical Selection (SP).

Curriculum 
The following academic programs (Bachelor of Science 3-year degree programs) are offered at EFOMM:
 B.Sc. in Maritime Studies (
 B.Sc. in Marine machines engineering (

The course has two periods and is developed in eight semesters, as follows:
 Academic Period, consisting of six academic semesters in a semi-boarding regime, with exclusive dedication of the student and structured in an annual serial system, divided into two semesters; and
 Internship Period, comprising two semesters on board for the Nautical course and two semesters on board for the Engineering course, with supervised internship.

During the academic semesters, the students are military personnel in the rank of Midshipman, as provided in the military statute, because they are performing the Navy Reserve Officers Training. After the end of the third year, the student will be named Nautical or Machinery Practitioner (PON/POM), will carry out the Internship Program (PREST), on board merchant vessels used in maritime navigation and maritime support, exclusively in companies indicated by the Instruction Centers.

After being declared second officer, the students are discharged from the active service of the Brazilian Navy, included as a second lieutenant in the Brazilian Navy Reserve Officer Corps, according to the legislation. As civilian students, they are governed by the Rules of Professional Maritime Education (EMP) and the internal rules of the Instruction Centers.

See also
List of maritime colleges

References

External links
 Efomm Official website 
 Brazilian Navy official website 
 Text of the history of the EFOMM 

Brazilian Navy
Undergraduate military academies of Brazil
Educational institutions established in 1980
1980 establishments in Brazil